Bridgewater House, Manchester is a packing and shipping warehouse at 58–60 Whitworth Street, Manchester, England. It is recorded in the National Heritage List for England as a designated Grade II listed building.

Bridgewater House was built as a shipping warehouse in 1912 to a design by Harry S. Fairhurst. It is built around a steel frame with a cladding of sandstone ashlar and white glazed terracotta in a large rectangular plan, with a loading bay at the rear. The building has eight storeys and a basement and 19 bays. The lower two floors are of stone, and the upper floors are of terracotta. Above the doorways are profile medallions of the Duke of Bridgewater. According to the architectural historian Clare Hartwell, Fairhurst's huge buildings are "steel-framed and built to high-quality fireproof specifications". The builders were J. Gerrard & Sons Ltd of Swinton. The authors of the Buildings of England series state that "Fairhurst's design revolutionised the business of loading and unloading goods and twenty-six lorries could be dealt with simultaneously using a drive-through system".

The building was constructed for Lloyd's Packing Warehouses Limited and, like many warehouses, was built to a common design with steps to a raised ground floor with showroom and offices. The first floor contained more offices, waiting rooms for clients, and sample and pattern rooms all decorated to impress customers. The working areas above were plain with large windows to allow in natural light. Orders were packed there and sent to the basement on hoists powered by Manchester's hydraulic power system and packed into bales using hydraulic presses before dispatch. The warehouse was lighted by gas.

As of 2012 the building, converted to offices, is owned by Bruntwood.

See also

Listed buildings in Manchester-M1

References
Citations

Sources

 

Grade II listed buildings in Manchester
Warehouses in England
Commercial buildings in Manchester